The National Council for Renewal and Democracy (CNRD-UBWIYUNGE) is a Rwandan political opposition party in exile. CNRD-UBWIYUNGE was formed on May 31, 2016, by members of the Rwandan refugee community in the Democratic Republic of Congo (DRC) with the objective to organize for the return in peace and dignity. A split in the Democratic Forces for the Liberation of Rwanda (FDLR) resulted in the creation of the new movement, led by Col. Wilson IRATEGEKA.

References 

Political organizations established in 2016
Rwandan diaspora
2016 establishments in the Democratic Republic of the Congo